The White Wolf of Icicle Creek is the 16th installment in the Nancy Drew point-and-click adventure game series by Her Interactive. The game is available to play on Microsoft Windows platforms and the Wii. It has an ESRB rating of E, though the game does have a premise unlikely to be understood by children and it does have some moments of mild violence and references to alcoholic beverages. Players take on the first-person view of a fictional amateur sleuth, Nancy Drew, and must solve the mystery through interrogation of suspects, solving puzzles, and discovering clues. There are two levels of gameplay, Junior and Senior detective modes, each offering a different difficulty level of puzzles and hints, however, neither of these changes affects the actual plot of the game. The game is loosely based on a book titled The Mystery of the Mother Wolf (2000).

The game was originally released in June 2007 for Windows and was ported to the Wii in December 2008. The latter incorporated the Wii's unique control scheme into the gameplay and mini-games.

Plot

Nancy Drew travels to Alberta, Canada to stay at the Icicle Creek Lodge. Chantal, the owner of the lodge, has asked her to investigate a recent string of suspicious accidents that have happened at the lodge. A white wolf appears at the scene of each accident and disappears when the police arrive. As Nancy arrives at the lodge, an explosion destroys the bunkhouse and a wolf howls ominously in the distance. Nancy must solve this mystery before Chantal and all the guests leave.

Characters
Nancy Drew - An 18-year-old amateur detective from the fictional town of River Heights in the United States. The player must solve the mystery from her perspective.
Ollie Randall - The lodge's handyman. He is tired of the wolf disrupting his day and terrorizing guests. He is gruff and believes that killing the wolf and mounting it on the wall will solve all of the Lodge's problems.
Freddie Randall - Ollie's daughter. She spends all day playing "Snow Princess" in her ice fort and challenging anyone who passes by to a snowball fight.
Yanni Volkstaia - An Olympic cross-country skier from the fictional country of Fredonia. He believes that his competitors are spying on him and are trying to rattle his nerves by causing the accidents at the Lodge.
Guadalupe "Lupe" Comillo - A birdwatcher from Los Angeles. She knows very little about birds, but plenty about wolves. Guadalupe arrived at the lodge just as the trouble with the wolf started, but she hasn't been frightened away yet.
Bill Kessler - An avid ice fisherman who spends his days catching Northern Pikes at the lodge. The wolf has put a damper on Bill's trip, and he wants it destroyed, even if it means destroying Icicle Creek Lodge.
Lou Talbot - An art student from California who has come to the lodge to snowshoe. He's the only one who says the wolf isn't responsible for the sabotage.

Cast
Nancy Drew / Freddie - Lani Minella
Ollie Randall - Mark Shone
Chantal Moique - Kate Jaeger
Bill Kessler - Jonah Von Spreekin
Lou Talbot - Gabriel Baron
Yanni Volkstaia - Evan Newton
Guadalupe Comillo - Kate Wisniewski
Sheriff Mahihkan / Additional Voices - Keith Dahlgren
Ned Nickerson - Scott Carty
Tino Balducci - Jeff Minnerly
Nikki Sabatini / Additional Voices - Amy Broomhall
Additional Voices - Brian Neel 
White Wolf - Tony Bradshaw

Reception

Reception to the game ranged from mixed to positive, with the story being praised though some criticized puzzles and pacing.

References

2007 video games
Detective video games
Video games based on Nancy Drew
Point-and-click adventure games
Video games developed in the United States
Video games scored by Kevin Manthei
Video games set in Canada
Windows games
Wii games
Her Interactive games
Single-player video games
North America-exclusive video games